The 2003–04 English Hockey League season took place from September 2003 until May 2004.

The men's title was won by Cannock for the second consecutive year with the women's title going to Hightown. There were no playoffs to determine champions or relegation after the regular season but there was a competition for the top six clubs called the Premiership tournament which culminated in a final held at Old Loughtonians Hockey Club on 9 May.

The Men's Cup was won by Reading and the Women's Cup was won by Hightown.

Men's Premier Division League Standings

Women's Premier Division League Standings

Men's Premiership Tournament

Women's Premiership Tournament

Men's Cup (EHA Cup)

Quarter-finals

Semi-finals

Final 
(Held at the Cannock on 4 April)

Women's Cup (EHA Cup)

Quarter-finals

Semi-finals

Final 
(Held at Cannock on 4 April)

References 

England Hockey League seasons
field hockey
field hockey
England